The French ironclad Atalante was a wooden-hulled armored corvette built for the French Navy in the mid-1860s. She played a minor role in the Franco-Prussian War of 1870, bombarded Vietnamese forts during the Battle of Thuận An in 1884 and participated in the Sino-French War of 1884–1885. Atalante was reduced to reserve in Saigon, French Indochina, in 1885 and sank there two years later after having been condemned.

Design and description
The s were designed as improved versions of the armored corvette  suitable for foreign deployments. Unlike their predecessor the Alma-class ships were true central battery ironclads as they were fitted with armored transverse bulkheads. Like most ironclads of their era they were equipped with a metal-reinforced ram.

Her crew numbered 316 officers and men.

Propulsion
The ship had a single horizontal return connecting-rod steam engine driving a single propeller. Her engine was powered by four oval boilers. On sea trials the engine produced  and the ship reached .

Armament
Atalante mounted her four  Modèle 1864 breech-loading guns in the central battery on the battery deck. The other two 194-millimeter guns were mounted in barbettes on the upper deck, sponsoned out over the sides of the ship. The four  guns were also mounted on the upper deck. She may have exchanged her Mle 1864 guns for Mle 1870 guns. The guns could fire both solid shot and explosive shells.

Armor
The unarmored portions of her sides were protected by  iron plates.

Service
Atalante was laid down at Cherbourg in June 1865 and launched on 12 April 1867. Her sea trials began on 1 April 1869 and she joined the reserve at Brest on 11 July 1869. Atalante was commissioned on 23 February 1870 and was initially assigned to the Evolutionary Squadron before transferring to the Northern Squadron in July 1870 at the outbreak of the Franco-Prussian War. The squadron was ordered to lift its blockade of the Prussian North Sea ports on 16 September and return to Cherbourg. Atalante went back into reserve in November 1870, but she was recommissioned the following year.

She was named as the flagship of the Pacific Squadron on 1 July 1872 under command of Rear Admiral Baron Roussin. On 14 August Atalante sailed from Lorient for the Pacific. On 8 August 1873, Atalante was put into the Fitzroy Dock at the Cockatoo Island Dockyard in Sydney, Australia. At the time she was the largest vessel to be drydocked in the harbour and the first ironclad to be docked in the Southern hemisphere.

She returned on 27 February 1874 where she placed into reserve but was recommissioned on 28 December 1875 as the flagship of the China Squadron under Rear Admiral Veron. She departed Lorient on 10 January 1876, but returned on 16 May 1878. The ship spent the next four years in reserve before being recommissioned on 3 July 1882 for service with the Cochinchina Division.

Atalante was transferred to the new Tonkin Coast Division when it was formed in 1883. During 18–21 August 1883 she participated in the Battle of Thuận An. This was an attack by the French on the forts defending the mouth of the Perfume River, leading to the Vietnamese capital of Huế in an attempt to intimidate the Vietnamese government. Atalante was assigned to bombard the North Fort by the French commander, Vice Admiral Amédée Courbet. After two days of bombardment a landing party from the ship captured the fort. Ensign Louis-Marie-Julien Viaud, who was aboard the Atalante during the battle and participated in the landing, wrote several articles graphically describing his experiences that were published in the newspaper Le Figaro under the pen-name of Pierre Loti.

The ship was assigned to the Far East Squadron under Admiral Courbet when it was formed by the amalgamation of the Tonkin Coast and Far Eastern Divisions in June 1884 in preparation for the Sino-French War of 1884–85. In early September 1884 Atalante was in Huế, but she carried Admiral Courbet to Keelung on 23 September. The ship was paid off into reserve in Saigon in 1885 and condemned two years later. She fell into such a state of disrepair that "she foundered one night and gradually sank into the mud."

Notes

Footnotes

References

 

 
 

Ships built in France
Alma-class ironclads
1868 ships
Maritime incidents in 1887